Michal Horáček (born 23 July 1952) is a Czech entrepreneur, lyricist, poet, writer, journalist and music producer. From 2007 until 2010, he was the chairman of the Czech Academy of Popular Music. He founded Czech betting company Fortuna. He stood to become Czech president in the 2018 presidential election, but came in 4th in the first round, failing to advance.

2018 presidential election
In April 2016, Horáček announced his possible candidacy in the 2018 Czech presidential election. Horáček announced his candidacy on 7 October 2016. He officially launched his campaign on 3 November 2016. He said that he wanted his campaign to be based on respect for all people and their opinions.

Horáček announced his advisers on 9 February 2017, including former Slovak presidential candidate Magdaléna Vášáryová, nuclear energy safety expert Dana Drábová, and surgeon Pavel Pafko. In 16 April 2017, Horáček started gathering the 50,000 signatures required for participation in the election. On 6 May he reported that he had gathered the required number of signatures. Horáček finished fourth of the nine candidates, with 9.18% of the vote. Horáček then endorsed Jiří Drahoš for the second round.

Political views
Horáček once said that "left-wing thinking isn't thinking", but later said that he had changed his mind and started to consider it more seriously. He describes himself as neither left-wing nor right-wing, but his platform for the 2018 presidential election was described by political scientists as left-wing. He supports European Union membership but would not oppose a referendum about leaving it.

Horáček stated in July 2016 that opposing immigration was "like opposing rain", and added that Czechs have historically helped immigrants. He has expressed opposition to migration quotas and to accepting large numbers of refugees, saying that the Czech Republic should not accept immigrants that Czechs do not want to accept.

Personal life
Horáček is a Roman Catholic. His great-uncle Jaroslav Heyrovský, a chemist and inventor, became the first Czech recipient of the Nobel Prize in 1959.

Discography
Studio albums
1987: Potměšilý host with Hana Hegerová & Petr Hapka
1988: V penziónu Svět with Petr Hapka
1996: Citová investice with Petr Hapka
2000: Richard Müller a hosté with Richard Müller & Jan Saudek2001: Mohlo by tu být i líp with Petr Hapka
2003: Tak to chodí with Jarda Svoboda
2006: Strážce plamene with Petr Hapka
2008: Ohrožený druh2009: Kudykam with Petr Hapka
2011: Tante Cose da Veder with Petr Hapka & Ondřej Brzobohatý
2012: O lásce, cti a kuráži2012: Michal Horáček Tribute2013: Český kalendářBibliography
1983: Království za koně, Olympia
1984: Zpráva z Kentucky, Turf klub SSM
1990: Jak pukaly ledy, Ex libris
1996: Los a sázka, Fortuna
2002: Kdo víc vsadí, ten víc bere with Ladislav Verecký, Nakladatelství Lidové noviny
2004: O české krvi otců vlasti, Nakladatelství Lidové noviny
2007: O tajemství královny krav, Nakladatelství Lidové noviny
2009: Kudykam, Nakladatelství Lidové noviny
2012: Český kalendář, Nakladatelství Lidové noviny
2012: Habitus hazardního hráče'', Nakladatelství Lidové noviny

Awards

References

External links 
 Michal Horáček (official website)

1952 births
Businesspeople from Prague
Journalists from Prague
Czech philanthropists
Politicians from Prague
Candidates in the 2018 Czech presidential election
Living people
Czech Roman Catholics
Czech male poets
Czech Roman Catholic writers